Gao Changli (born July 1937 in Yutai County, Jining, Shandong) is a politician of the People's Republic of China.

Biography
He joined the Communist Party of China in 1956.

Gao graduated from Renmin University of China in 1963. He was the Minister of Justice from 1998 to 2000.

Gao was the alternate member of the 15th CPC Central Committee.

External links
 Profile of Gao Changli, People's Daily Online.

1937 births
Living people
Politicians from Jining
People's Republic of China politicians from Shandong
Renmin University of China alumni
Chinese Communist Party politicians from Shandong
Supreme People's Court judges
Ministers of Justice of the People's Republic of China
20th-century Chinese judges
21st-century Chinese judges